Wiley Interdisciplinary Reviews: Systems Biology and Medicine (abbreviated WIREs Systems Biology and Medicine) is a bimonthly peer-reviewed interdisciplinary scientific review journal covering systems biology and medicine. It was established in 2009 and is published by John Wiley & Sons as part of its Wiley Interdisciplinary Reviews journal series. The editors-in-chief are Joseph H. Nadeau (Pacific Northwest Research Institute) and Shankar Subramaniam	(University of California, San Diego). According to the Journal Citation Reports, the journal has a 2020 impact factor of 5.000, ranking it 48th out of 140 journals in the category "Medicine, Research & Experimental".

References

External links

Systems biology
Biology journals
General medical journals
Publications established in 2009
Bimonthly journals
Wiley (publisher) academic journals
English-language journals